Joseph Stephen Alpert (born 1942 in Connecticut) is an American cardiologist and professor of medicine at the University of Arizona Sarver Heart Center. He is also the editor-in-chief of the American Journal of Medicine.

Education
Alpert received his bachelor's degree from Yale University magna cum laude. He later received his medical doctorate from Harvard Medical School, cum laude.

Career
In 1978, Alpert joined the faculty of the University of Massachusetts as professor and chief of the Section of Cardiovascular Medicine. In 1992, he was appointed the Robert S. and Irene P. Flinn Professor of Medicine and Chair of the Department of Medicine at the University of Arizona College of Medicine. He stepped down from this position in 2006 to join the dean's administrative team at this college.

Research
Alpert is known for helping create a universal definition of myocardial infarction, in his capacity as cochair of the Joint European Society of Cardiology-American College of Cardiology Foundation-American Heart Association-World Heart Federation Task Force for the Universal Definition of Myocardial Infarction. He has published more than 700 original research articles, reviews, editorials, and clinical reports as well as writing or editing more than 50 books.

References

1942 births
Living people
American cardiologists
Physicians from Connecticut
University of Arizona faculty
Yale University alumni
Medical journal editors
Harvard Medical School alumni
Place of birth missing (living people)